The Big Eight Conference was an NCAA athletic conference that existed from 1907 to 1996, when it and the Southwest Conference disbanded to create the Big 12 Conference. The post-season conference tournament was instituted in 1977 and from that time the winner won the conference's automatic NCAA tournament bid. From 1977 until 1985, the quarterfinals were played on the campus sites of the higher seeded teams. The last Big Eight men's basketball tournament ran through the conference's final season in 1996.  Missouri won the most Big Eight tournament titles with six.  Colorado was the only conference member not to win at least one tournament title during its existence.

Tournament champions by year

Championships by school

Television coverage

See also
Big 12 men's basketball tournament

References